Taliya established in 2004 is the first independent privately held pre-paid mobile network operator in Iran.

In December 2015 Taliya by roaming with IR-MCI (Hamrahe Aval) succeeded to complete national coverage in all parts of Iran. In February 2019, Taliya has upgraded its network to 4.5G ، For this reason, subscribers should change their current SIM cards with new 4G SIM cards, to take advantage of new Taliya services.

History
Using software and hardware technologies produced by Siemens, Alcatel and Ericsson as well as a consultant namely Tele2, Taliya started its activity in February 2004 as the first pre-paid cell phones independent network.

Services
Taliya is the first provider of pre-paid SIM Cards in Iran. The Facilities of Taliya SIM cards include making calls, sending, and receiving short messages and mobile data.

Taliya cards
Taliya has produced some credit charges in various colors, each signifying a specific amount of charge for the customers interested in physical charge cards. Taliya charge cards may be obtained from Taliya stores and Taliya Customer Centers as well as stores and kiosks.

Electronic charge cards
To facilitate access to Taliya credits, Taliya provides electronic pre-paid charges, which are readily accessible via bank and Credit Institutions' ATMs, POS, Web Kiosks, Websites and Vending Machines.

References

Mobile phone companies of Iran
Privately held companies of Iran
Telecommunications companies established in 2004
Iranian companies established in 2004